Sharon is an unincorporated community located within Upper Freehold Township in Monmouth County, New Jersey, United States. Located at the intersection of Herbert Road and Sharon Station Road, the settlement is the site of a former stop on the Pemberton and Hightstown Railroad. Except for a few single-family homes in the area, most of the area is farmland. The railroad has since been abandoned and is being converted to the Union Transportation Trail, a rail trail. Sharon is the current northern terminus of the trail.

See also
New Sharon, New Jersey – nearby settlement

References

Upper Freehold Township, New Jersey
Unincorporated communities in Monmouth County, New Jersey
Unincorporated communities in New Jersey